Monterissa gowerensis, also known as the Lord Howe microturban, is a species of minute cave snails with an operculum, gastropod mollusks in the family Hydrocenidae.

Description
The globosely turbinate shell of adult snails is 2.1–2.4 mm in height, with a diameter of 1.7–2 mm, with deeply impressed sutures. It is smooth, glossy and pale golden-brown in colour. The umbilicus is closed. The ovately lunate aperture has an operculum.

Distribution and habitat
This terrestrial and freshwater species occurs on Australia's Lord Howe Island in the Tasman Sea, where it is rare and found mainly on the slopes of Mount Gower and Mount Lidgbird in leaf litter and cliff crevices.

References

Hydrocenidae
Gastropods of Lord Howe Island
Vulnerable fauna of Australia
Gastropods described in 1944
Taxonomy articles created by Polbot
Taxa named by Tom Iredale